The nautilus is a pelagic marine mollusc of the cephalopod family Nautilidae. The nautilus is the sole extant family of the superfamily Nautilaceae and of its smaller but near equal suborder, Nautilina.

It comprises six living species in two genera, the type of which is the genus Nautilus. Though it more specifically refers to species Nautilus pompilius, the name chambered nautilus is also used for any of the Nautilidae. All are protected under CITES Appendix II.

Nautilidae, both extant and extinct, are characterized by involute or more or less convolute shells that are generally smooth, with compressed or depressed whorl sections, straight to sinuous sutures, and a tubular, generally central siphuncle. Having survived relatively unchanged for hundreds of millions of years, nautiluses represent the only living members of the subclass nautiloidea, and are often considered "living fossils".

The word nautilus is derived from the Greek word  nautílos "sailor", it originally referred to a type of octopus of the genus Argonauta, also known as 'paper nautilus', which were thought to use two of their arms as sails.

Anatomy

Cirri
The "tentacles" of the nautilus are actually cirri (singular: cirrus), composed of long, soft, flexible appendages which are retractable into corresponding hardened sheaths. Unlike the 8–10 head appendages of coleoid cephalopods, nautiluses have many cirri. In the early embryonic stages of nautilus development, a single molluscan foot differentiates into a total of 60–90 cirri, varying even within a species. Nautilus cirri also differ from the tentacles of some coleoids in that they are non-elastic and lack pads or suckers. Instead, nautilus cirri adhere to prey using their ridged surface. Nautiluses have a powerful grip, and attempts to take an object already grasped by a nautilus may tear away the animal's cirri, which will remain firmly attached to the surface of the object.

The main cirri emerge from sheaths which cohere into a single firm fleshy mass. Also, the pair of cirri before the eye (pre-ocular) and the pair of cirri behind the eye (post-ocular) are separate from the others. These are more evidently grooved, with more pronounced ridges. They are extensively ciliated and are believed to serve an olfactory purpose.

Digestive system
The radula is wide and distinctively has nine teeth.

The mouth consists of a parrot-like beak made up of two interlocking jaws capable of ripping the animal's food— mostly crustaceans— from the rocks to which they are attached. Males can be superficially differentiated from females by examining the arrangement of tentacles around the buccal cone: males have a spadix organ (shaped like a spike or shovel) located on the left side of the cone making the cone look irregular, whereas the buccal cone of the female is bilaterally symmetrical.

The crop is the largest portion of the digestive tract, and is highly extensible. From the crop, food passes to the small muscular stomach for crushing, and then goes past a digestive caecum before entering the relatively brief intestine.

Circulatory system
Like all cephalopods, the blood of the nautilus contains hemocyanin, which is blue in its oxygenated state. There are two pairs of gills which are the only remnants of the ancestral metamerism to be visible in extant cephalopods. Oxygenated blood arrives at the heart through four ventricles and flows out to the animal's organs through distinct aortas but returns through veins which are too small and varied to be specifically described. The one exception to this is the vena cava, a single large vein running along the underside of the crop into which nearly all other vessels containing deoxygenated blood empty. All blood passes through one of the four sets of filtering organs (composed of one pericardial appendage and two renal appendages) upon leaving the vena cava and before arriving at the gills for re-oxygenation. Blood waste is emptied through a series of corresponding pores into the pallial cavity.

Nervous system
The central component of the nautilus nervous system is the oesophageal nerve ring which is a collection of ganglia, commissures, and connectives that together form a ring around the animal's oesophagus. From this ring extend all of the nerves forward to the mouth, tentacles, and funnel; laterally to the eyes and rhinophores; and posteriorly to the remaining organs.

The nerve ring does not constitute what is typically considered a cephalopod "brain": the upper portion of the nerve ring lacks differentiated lobes, and most of the nervous tissue appears to focus on finding and consuming food (i.e., it lacks a "higher learning" center). Nautili also tend to have rather short memory spans, and the nerve ring is not protected by any form of brain case.

Shell

Nautili are the sole living cephalopods whose bony body structure is externalized as a planispiral shell. The animal can withdraw completely into its shell and close the opening with a leathery hood formed from two specially folded tentacles. The nautilus shell is composed of two layers: a matte white outer layer with dark orange stripes, and a striking white iridescent inner layer. The innermost portion of the shell is a pearlescent blue-gray. The osmeña pearl, contrarily to its name, is not a pearl, but a jewellery product derived from this part of the shell.

Internally, the shell divides into camerae (chambers), the chambered section being called the phragmocone. The divisions are defined by septa, each of which is pierced in the middle by a duct, the siphuncle. As the nautilus matures, it creates new, larger camerae and moves its growing body into the larger space, sealing the vacated chamber with a new septum. The camerae increase in number from around 4 at the moment of hatching to 30 or more in adults.

The shell coloration also keeps the animal cryptic in the water. When seen from above, the shell is darker in color and marked with irregular stripes, which helps it blend into the dark water below. The underside is almost completely white, making the animal indistinguishable from brighter waters near the surface. This mode of camouflage is called countershading.

The nautilus shell presents one of the finest natural examples of a logarithmic spiral, although it is not a golden spiral. The use of nautilus shells in art and literature is covered at nautilus shell.

Size
N. pompilius is the largest species in the genus. One form from Indonesia and northern Australia, once called N. repertus, may reach  in diameter. However, most nautilus species never exceed . Nautilus macromphalus is the smallest species, usually measuring only .

Physiology

Buoyancy and movement

To swim, the nautilus draws water into and out of the living chamber with its hyponome, which uses jet propulsion. This mode of propulsion is generally considered inefficient compared to propulsion with fins or undulatory locomotion, however, the nautilus has been found to be particularly efficient compared to other jet-propelled marine animals like squid and jellyfish, or even salmon at low speeds. It is thought that this is related to the use of asymmetrical contractile cycles and may be an adaptation to mitigate metabolic demands and protect against hypoxia when foraging at depth. While water is inside the chamber, the siphuncle extracts salt from it and diffuses it into the blood.

The animal adjusts its buoyancy only in long term density changes by osmosis, either removing liquid from its chambers or allowing water from the blood in the siphuncle to slowly refill the chambers. This is done in response to sudden changes in buoyancy that can occur with predatory attacks of fish, which can break off parts of the shell. The gas also contained in the chambers is slightly below atmospheric pressure at sea level. The maximum depth at which they can regulate buoyancy by osmotic removal of chamber liquid is not known.

The nautilus has the extremely rare ability to withstand being brought to the surface from its deep natural habitat without suffering any apparent damage from the experience. The exact reasons for this ability, which is thought to be coincidental rather than specifically functional, are not known, though the perforated structure of the animal's vena cava is thought to play an important role.

Senses

Unlike many other cephalopods, nautiluses do not have what many consider to be good vision; their eye structure is highly developed but lacks a solid lens. Whereas a sealed lens allows for the formation of highly focused and clear, detailed surrounding imagery, nautiluses have a simple pinhole eye open to the environment which only allows for the creation of correspondingly simple imagery.

Instead of vision, the animal is thought to use olfaction (smell) as the primary sense for foraging and for locating and identifying potential mates.

The "ear" of the nautilus consists of structures called otocysts located immediately behind the pedal ganglia near the nerve ring. They are oval structures densely packed with elliptical calcium carbonate crystals.

Brain and intelligence

Nautiluses are much closer to the first cephalopods that appeared about 500 million years ago than the early modern cephalopods that appeared maybe 100 million years later (ammonoids and coleoids). They have a seemingly simple brain, not the large complex brains of octopus, cuttlefish and squid, and had long been assumed to lack intelligence. But the cephalopod nervous system is quite different from that of other animals, and recent experiments have shown not only memory, but a changing response to the same event over time.

In a study in 2008, a group of nautiluses (N. pompilius) were given food as a bright blue light flashed until they began to associate the light with food, extending their tentacles every time the blue light was flashed. The blue light was again flashed without the food 3 minutes, 30 minutes, 1 hour, 6 hours, 12 hours, and 24 hours later. The nautiluses continued to respond excitedly to the blue light for up to 30 minutes after the experiment. An hour later they showed no reaction to the blue light. However, between 6 and 12 hours after the training, they again responded to the blue light, but more tentatively. The researchers concluded that nautiluses had memory capabilities similar to the "short-term" and "long-term memories" of the more advanced cephalopods, despite having different brain structures. However the long-term memory capability of nautiluses was much shorter than that of other cephalopods. The nautiluses completely forgot the earlier training 24 hours later, in contrast to octopuses, for example, which can remember conditioning for weeks afterwards. However, this may be simply the result of the conditioning procedure being suboptimal for sustaining long-term memories in nautiluses. Nevertheless, the study showed that scientists had previously underestimated the memory capabilities of nautiluses.

Reproduction and lifespan
Nautiluses reproduce by laying eggs. Gravid females attach the fertilized eggs, either singly or in small batches, to rocks in warmer waters (21–25 Celsius), whereupon the eggs take eight to twelve months to develop until the  juveniles hatch. Females spawn once per year and regenerate their gonads, making nautiluses the only cephalopods to present iteroparity or polycyclic spawning.

Nautiluses are sexually dimorphic, in that males have four tentacles modified into an organ, called the "spadix", which transfers sperm into the female's mantle during mating. At sexual maturity, the male shell becomes slightly larger than the female's. Males have been found to greatly outnumber females in practically all published studies, accounting for 60 to 94% of all recorded individuals at different sites.

The lifespan of nautiluses may exceed 20 years, which is exceptionally lengthy for a cephalopod, many of whom live less than three even in captivity and under ideal living conditions. However, nautiluses typically do not reach sexual maturity until they are about 15 years old, limiting their reproductive lifespan to often less than five years.

Ecology

Range and habitat

Nautiluses are only found in the Indo-Pacific, from 30° N to 30° S latitude and 90° E to 175° E longitude. They inhabit the deep slopes of coral reefs.

Nautiluses usually inhabit depths of several hundred metres. It has long been believed that nautiluses rise at night to feed, mate, and lay eggs, but it appears that, in at least some populations, the vertical movement patterns of these animals are far more complex. Nautiluses generally avoid water temperatures above .

Diet
Nautiluses are scavengers and opportunistic predators. They eat molts of lobsters, hermit crabs, and carrion of any kind.

Evolution

Fossil records indicate that nautiloids have not evolved much during the last 500 million years. Many were initially straight-shelled, as in the extinct genus Lituites. They developed in the Late Cambrian period and became a significant group of sea predators during the Ordovician period. The other cephalopod subclass, Coleoidea, diverged from the nautiloids long ago and the nautilus has remained relatively unchanged since. Nautiloids were much more extensive and varied 200 million years ago. The ancestors of all Coleoidea (shell-less Cephalopods) once possessed shells, and many early Cephalopod species are only known from shell remains. Following the K-Pg extinction event most Nautiloid species went extinct, while members of Coleoidea managed to survive. Following the mass extinction the Nautilus became the only extant species of Nautiloids. Extinct relatives of the nautilus include ammonites, such as the baculites and goniatites.

The family Nautilidae has its origin in the Trigonocerataceae (Centroceratina), specifically in the Syringonautilidae of the Late Triassic and continues to this day with Nautilus, the type genus, and its close relative, Allonautilus.

Fossil genera

The fossil record of Nautilidae begins with Cenoceras in the Late Triassic, a highly varied genus that makes up the Jurassic Cenoceras complex. Cenoceras is evolute to involute, and globular to lentincular; with a suture that generally has a shallow ventral and lateral lobe and a siphuncle that is variable in position but never extremely ventral or dorsal. Cenoceras is not found above the Middle Jurassic and is followed by the Upper Jurassic-Miocene Eutrephoceras.

Eutrephoceras is generally subglobular, broadly rounded laterally and ventrally, with a small to occluded umbilicus, broadly rounded hyponomic sinus, only slightly sinuous sutures, and a small siphuncle that is variable in position.

Next to appear is the Lower Cretaceous Strionautilus from India and the European ex-USSR, named by Shimankiy in 1951. Strionautilus is compressed, involute, with fine longitudinal striations. Whorl sections are subrectangular, sutures sinuous, the siphuncle subcentral.

Also from the Cretaceous is Pseudocenoceras, named by Spath in 1927. Pseudocenoceras is compressed, smooth, with subrectangular whorl sections, flattened venter, and a deep umbilicus. The suture crosses the venter essentially straight and has a broad, shallow, lateral lobe. The siphuncle is small and subcentral. Pseudocenoceras is found in the Crimea and in Libya.

Carinonautilus is a genus from the Upper Cretaceous of India, named by Spengler in 1919. Carinonautilus is a very involute form with high whorl section and flanks that converge on a narrow venter that bears a prominent rounded keel. The umbilicus is small and shallow, the suture only slightly sinuous. The siphuncle is unknown.

Obinautilus has also been placed in Nautilidae by some authorities, though it may instead be an argonautid octopus.

Taxonomy

The family Nautilidae contains up to six extant species and several extinct species:

Genus Allonautilus
A. perforatus
A. scrobiculatus
Genus Nautilus
N. belauensis
†N. cookanum
N. macromphalus
N. pompilius (type)
N. p. pompilius
N. p. suluensis
†N. praepompilius
N. stenomphalus

Recent genetic data has pointed to there being only three extant species: A. scrobiculatus, N. macromphalus, and N. pompilius, with N. belauensis and N. stenomphalus both subsumed under N. pompilius, possibly as subspecies.

Dubious or uncertain taxa
The following taxa associated with the family Nautilidae are of uncertain taxonomic status:

Conservation status and human use 
Nautilus are collected or fished for sale as live animals or to carve the shells for souvenirs and collectibles, not for just the shape of their shells, but also the nacreous inner shell layer, which is used as a pearl substitute. Nautilus shells were popular items in the Renaissance and Baroque cabinet of curiosities and were often mounted by goldsmiths on a thin stem to make extravagant nautilus shell cups. The low fecundity, late maturity, long gestation period and long life-span of nautiluses suggest that these species are vulnerable to over-exploitation and demand for the ornamental shell is causing population declines. The threats from trade in these shells has led to countries such as Indonesia legally protecting the chambered nautilus with fines of up to US $8,500 and/or 5 years in prison for trading in this species. Despite their legal protection, these shells were reported to be openly sold at tourist areas in Bali as of 2014. The continued trade of these animals has led to a call for increased protection and in 2016 all species in Family Nautilidae were added to CITES Appendix II, regulating international trade.

See also

 Cephalopod size, for maximum shell diameters
 Historiae animalium by Conrad Gessner, first book with fossil illustrations
 The Nautilus, a malacological journal
 The Chambered Nautilus, a poem of Oliver Wendell Holmes
Nautilus Pompilius, a Russian rock band

References

Notes

Bibliography 
 Ward, P.D. 1988. In Search of Nautilus. Simon and Schuster.

External links

 Nautilidae discussion forum, tonmo.com
 Waikïkï Aquarium: Marine Life Profile: Chambered Nautilus, waguarium.org
 A molecular and karyological approach to the taxonomy of Nautilus, utmb.edu

 
Articles containing video clips
Extant Triassic first appearances